The Colored Cemetery on 10th Avenue in Columbus, Georgia, is a  cemetery used by African-American citizens of Columbus that has burials dating back to at least the 1840s.  In 1936, the name Porterdale Cemetery began to be used also.  It is believed to have been included in the 1828 plan for the city by surveyor Edward Lloyd Thomas.

The cemetery was listed on the National Register of Historic Places in 1980.

The name "Porterdale" for the cemetery is apparently in honor of Richard P. Porter, the cemetery's sexton from about 1878 to about 1920.

See also
Old City Cemetery, cemetery of whites in Columbus, also founded in 1828 and NRHP-listed

References

Cemeteries on the National Register of Historic Places in Georgia (U.S. state)
1845 establishments in Georgia (U.S. state)
Protected areas of Muscogee County, Georgia
Cemeteries in Georgia (U.S. state)
National Register of Historic Places in Muscogee County, Georgia